Zambia is divided into 10 provinces for administrative purposes. Each province is headed by a minister appointed by the President and there are ministries of central government for each province. The administrative head of each province is the Permanent Secretary, appointed by the President. There are Deputy Permanent Secretary, heads of government departments and civil servants at the provincial level.

Provinces are further divided into districts and almost all the district headquarters are the same as the district names. Each of the 116 districts in the 10 provinces has a council which is headed by an elected representative, called councilor. Each councilor holds office for five years. Each council is responsible for raising and collecting local taxes and the budgets of the council are audited and submitted every year after the annual budget. Zambia has predominantly rural provinces and hence there are only three municipal councils. The government stipulates 63 different functions for the councils with the majority of them being infrastructure management and local administration.

In terms of population, Lusaka was the most populated and most densely populated with a population of 2,191,225 and density of 100 persons per square kilometre. Agriculture is the major profession in most of the provinces in Zambia. Maize, mixed beans, rice, sorghum, soya beans, sunflower, sweet potatoes and wheat are the major crops in the provinces. Among all provinces, Central had the maximum area of  constituting 20.64 per cent of the totals, while Luapula had the smallest area at 3.06 per cent.

List of provinces

Administration
Provincial government is set up purely for administrative purposes. Each province is headed by a minister appointed by the President and there are ministries of central government for each province. The administrative head of each province is the Permanent Secretary, appointed by the President. There are Deputy Permanent Secretary, heads of government departments and civil servants at the provincial level. Provinces are further divided into districts and almost all the district headquarters are the same as the district names. Each of the 116 districts in the 10 provinces has a council which is headed by an elected representative, called councilor. Each councilor holds office for three years. The administrative staff of the council is selected based on Local Government Service Commission from within or outside the district. The office of the provincial government is located in each of the district headquarters and has provincial local government officers and auditors. Each council is responsible for raising and collecting local taxes and the budgets of the council are audited and submitted every year after the annual budget. The elected members of the council do not draw salaries, but are paid allowances from the council. Zambia has predominantly rural provinces and hence there are only four city councils (Lusaka; Ndola; Kitwe; Chipata) as of 2017. The government stipulates 63 different functions for the councils with the majority of them being infrastructure management and local administration. Councils are mandated to maintain each of their community centres, zoos, local parks, drainage system, playgrounds, cemeteries, caravan sites, libraries, museums and art galleries. They also work along with specific government departments for helping in agriculture, conservation of natural resources, postal service, establishing and maintaining hospitals, schools and colleges. The councils prepare schemes that encourage community participation.

Primary data
Western Province was the largest in terms of area, having 126,386 km2, while Lusaka was the smallest with 21,896 km2. In terms of population, Lusaka was the most populated and most densely populated with a population of 2,191,225 and densf 100 persons per km2. As of 2010, Western Province had the best sex ratio of 108 females for every 100 males, while Copperbelt had the lowest of 101. Northern had the highest number of basic schools, while Copperbelt had the highest number of high schools. The unemployment rate of youth (55%) and general unemployment rate (32%) was the highest in Copperbelt province, while Eastern had the lowest unemployment rate of 6 per cent.  AIDS death was maximum in Copperbelt with 26,799 recorded deaths in 2010, while it was lowest in North-Western with 2,859 recorded deaths. Lusaka Province had the most doctors and fewest malaria related incidents, while North-Western has the lowest number of doctors.

Economy
Agriculture is the major profession in most of the provinces in Zambia. Maize, mixed beans, rice, sorghum, soya beans, sunflower, sweet potatoes and wheat are the major crops in the provinces. Among all provinces, Central had the maximum area, constituting 20.64 per cent of the total, while Luapula had the smallest area at 3.06 per cent. Maize production was maximum in Eastern (22.5%), mixed beans (51.66%) in Northern, sorghum in Southern (40.62%), sunflower in Eastern (70.2%), soya beans (45.06%), sweet potatoes (28.5%) and wheat (49.51%) in Central Province.

Human Development 
This is a list of 9 provinces by Human Development Index as of 2017.

See also
Districts of Zambia
ISO 3166-2:ZM

References

 
Subdivisions of Zambia
Zambia, Provinces
Zambia 1
Provinces, Zambia
Zambia geography-related lists